Ochimo: The Spirit Warrior is an adventure module published in 1987 for the Advanced Dungeons & Dragons fantasy role-playing game.

Plot summary
Ochimo the Spirit Warrior is an adventure scenario for the original Oriental Adventures in which the player characters travel to Akari Island to fight against the spirit of a warrior from ancient times.

Ochimo, the Spirit Warrior includes a timeline for an important portion of the world presented in Oriental Adventures, and features a scenario set on an island that presents aspects of the culture of the mainland.

Publication history
OA3 Ochimo the Spirit Warrior was written by Jeff Grubb, with a cover by Jeff Easley and interior illustrations by Jim Holloway, and was published by TSR in 1987 as a 48-page booklet with an outer folder.

Reception
Michael Mullen reviewed the adventure in Space Gamer/Fantasy Gamer No. 81, and concluded that "Ochimo, the Spirit Warrior serves as a moderate introduction to the more Chinese elements of the world" while providing a background timeline for the major civilization of the mainland.  He noted that while the adventure is intended to be used for characters of level 5-7, with seven pre-rolled characters included, "you may find that the players should bring characters towards the upper end of that scale, or maybe even levels 7-9.  The players face some major opposition, and well played, there should be few characters left standing at the end of the adventure."

References

Dungeons & Dragons modules
Role-playing game supplements introduced in 1987